Vomécourt is a commune in the Vosges department in Grand Est in northeastern France.

See also
Communes of the Vosges department
Philippe de Vomécourt Special Operations Executive, (SOE) agent during World War II.
Pierre de Vomécourt, Special Operations Executive (SOE) agent during World War II.

References

Communes of Vosges (department)